Gustavo Caetano-Anollés is Professor of Bioinformatics in the Department of Crop Sciences, University of Illinois at Urbana-Champaign. He is an expert in the field of evolutionary and comparative genomics.

Biography
 Studies and early researches
Caetano-Anolles obtained his doctorate in biochemistry at the National University of La Plata in Argentina in 1986. During his early career at Ohio State University and the University of Tennessee he studied the symbiosis between nitrogen-fixing root nodule-forming bacteria and legumes from different angles, exploring the role of bacterial attachment and chemotaxis and plant systemic signals that control nodule number. While in Tennessee he co-invented the technique of DNA amplification with arbitrary primers [see DNA amplification fingerprinting (DAF) and randomly amplified polymorphic DNA (RAPD)]. This technique generates fingerprints of nucleic acids and molecular markers useful for genome mapping and molecular ecology and evolution. He also developed widely used methods for the silver staining of DNA that are commercially available. He holds several US patents in molecular biology. He joined the faculty of the Department of Biology at the University of Oslo in 1998 and directed the laboratory of molecular ecology and evolution.

Since 2003, he has been at the University of Illinois and is an affiliate of the Carl R. Woese Institute for Genomic Biology. He received the Emile Zuckerkandl Prize in molecular evolution in 2002 and became University Scholar of the University of Illinois in 2010. His current research integrates structural biology, genomics and molecular evolution. He is particularly interested in evolution of macromolecular structure. His research group has recently reconstructed the history of the protein world using information in entire genomes, revealed the existence of a 'big bang' of protein domain combinations late in evolution, traced evolution of proteins in biological networks (see the MANET database), uncovered the origin of modern biological networks in pathways of nucleotide metabolism, and revealed important evolutionary reductive tendencies in the structural make up of proteins.

 A new virus theory
Recently, his group used genomic information to propose that viruses are derived from ancient cells and were the first lineage to arise from the last universal ancestor of life (LUCA). The group also found Archaea was the first cellular lineage to arise in evolution from a universal ancestor that was complex at the molecular and cellular level. His team is currently exploring the role of structure and organization in the coevolution of proteins and functional RNA (e.g., ribosomal and transfer RNA), including the origin and history of translation and the genetic code. Phylogenomic analysis of RNA and protein molecules that make up the massive ribosomal ensemble shows that the most ancient ribosomal RNA structure interacted with the most ancient ribosomal protein and that this triggered a coordinated accretion process that ultimately resulted in a functional ribosomal core, half-way in evolution of life and prior to cellular diversification. These coevolutionary patterns challenge the ancient ‘RNA world’ hypothesis and place the rise of genetics late in evolution.

 Family
Caetano-Anollés and his wife Gloria have two children, both of whom have been part of his research team. Gloria is a surgical nurse and worked in the thoracic surgery team of René Favaloro in Argentina and in the surgical department of the Baptist Hospital of East Tennessee.

Selected publications 

Nasir A, Kim KM, Caetano-Anollés G (2012) Viral evolution. Primordial cellular origins and late adaptation to parasitism. Mobile Genetic Elements 2(5): 1-6.
Kim KM, Win T, Jiang YY, Chen LL, Xiong M, Caetano-Anollés D, Zhang HY, Caetano-Anollés G (2012) Protein domain structure uncovers the origin of aerobic metabolism and the rise of planetary oxygen. Structure 20(1): 67-76.
Kim KM, Caetano-Anollés G (2010) Emergence and evolution of modern molecular functions inferred from phylogenomic analysis of ontological data" Molecular Biology and Evolution 27(7)  1710-1733.
Caetano-Anollés G, Wang M, Mittenthal JE (2009) The origin, evolution and structure of the protein world. Biochemical Journal 417(3): 621-637.
Sun FJ, Caetano-Anollés G (2008) Evolutionary patterns in the sequence and structure of transfer RNA: early origins of Archaea and viruses. PLoS Computational Biology 4(3): e1000018.
Sun FJ, Caetano-Anollés G (2008) The origin and evolution of tRNA inferred from phylogenetic analysis of structure" Journal of Molecular Evolution 66(1) 21-35.
Wang M, Yafremava LS, Caetano-Anollés D, Mittenthal JS, Caetano-Anollés G (2007) Reductive evolution of architectural repertoires in proteomes and the birth of the tripartite world" Genome Research 17(11)  1572-1585.
Wang M, Caetano-Anollés G (2006) Global phylogeny determined by the combination of protein domains in proteomes" Molecular Biology and Evolution 23(12)  2444-54.
Mathesius U, Mulders S, Gao M, Teplitski M, Caetano-Anollés G, Rolfe BG, Bauer WD (2003) Extensive and specific responses of a eukaryote to bacterial-sensing signals. Proceedings of the National Academy of Sciences USA 100(3)  1444-1449.
Caetano-Anollés G, Caetano-Anollés D (2003) An evolutionarily structured universe of protein architecture" Genome Research 13(7)  1563-1571.
Caetano-Anollés G (2002) Tracing the evolution of RNA structure in ribosomes" Nucleic Acids Research 30(11)  2575-2587.
Caetano-Anollés G (2002) Evolved RNA secondary structure and the rooting of the universal tree" Journal of Molecular Evolution 54(3)  333-345.
Caetano-Anollés G (1996) Scanning of nucleic acids by in vitro amplification: new developments and applications. Nature Biotechnology 14(13)  1668-1674.
Caetano-Anollés G, Gresshoff PM (1991) Plant genetic control of nodulation. Annual Review in Microbiology 45:345-382.

References

External links

Gustavo Caetano-Anollés page at the Department of Crop Sciences: 
Evolutionary Bioinformatics laboratory: 
Evolutionary Bioinformatics blog: 
Molecular Ancestry Networks (MANET): 

Caetano-Anolles
Living people
University of Illinois Urbana-Champaign faculty
Year of birth missing (living people)
Argentine emigrants to the United States